Arto Jääskeläinen (born 9 October 1960) is a Finnish biathlete. He competed at the 1984 Winter Olympics and the 1988 Winter Olympics.

References

External links
 

1960 births
Living people
Finnish male biathletes
Olympic biathletes of Finland
Biathletes at the 1984 Winter Olympics
Biathletes at the 1988 Winter Olympics
People from Orimattila
Sportspeople from Päijät-Häme